Mahnoor Usman  is a Pakistani film actress. She marked her debut as a child artist in the critically acclaimed independent film Siyaah, for which she was nominated as "Best Actor in a Negative Role" at the 1st ARY Film Awards. She further went on to do local dramas and TV Commercials in which she appeared as a child artist as well. She is currently a student of Business Administration. Alongside that, she can be seen in various forums and platforms speaking on the topics of mental health, 
discrimination, hate crime, anti-narcotics, entrepreneurial journeys, women empowerment, child abuse, creativity, and education.

Career
Mahnoor started her career at the age of 8 as a theatre performer and later went on to do her first movie.
She marked her acting debut in the 2013 film Siyaah, where she played an emotionally recluse orphan girl adopted by a couple who cannot have a child. Her acting skill was praised throughout the realm. She has not been seen in the media industry since her first movie. 
She suffered from clinical depression in her teenage years and was later diagnosed with severe Polycystic Ovary Syndrome.
Due to her journey with these two illnesses, she then went on to speak and spread awareness about depression and PCOS at various platforms.
She is a YLC alumni. She has also worked in various business departments including HR, Marketing, and Customer Care to get practical experience of her degree. She has led many teams to execute projects and campaigns throughout the country for multinationals and startups.
At the moment she is the official consultant of Being Woman UK - A charity organization founded by her sister Fareeha Usman in Ashington, Northumberland. She continues her studies side by side.

Films

References

External links 
 

Actresses from Karachi
21st-century Pakistani actresses
Living people
2000 births